Venus Patrice James (born March 21, 1979) is a retired American soccer player. James was part of the Djurgården Swedish champions' team of 2004.

Career
James played for UCLA Bruins while studying at UCLA 1997–2000. After her college career, she played for Bay Area CyberRays and Carolina Courage before joining Djurgården/Älvsjö in 2004. She made her debut for Djurgården/Älvsjö on May 15, 2004, in their 2–0 win against Mallbacken in the 2004 Damallsvenskan.

Venus James was part of the team in Djurgården/Älvsjö's final defeat against Turbine Potsdam in the 2005 UEFA Women's Cup Final. She left Djurgården/Älvsjö after the 2005 season.

Honours

Club 
 Djurgården/Älvsjö 
 Damallsvenskan: 2004

References

American women's soccer players
UCLA Bruins women's soccer players
San Jose CyberRays players
Carolina Courage players
Djurgårdens IF Fotboll (women) players
Damallsvenskan players
1979 births
Living people
Sportspeople from Oakland, California
Soccer players from California
Women's association football forwards
Women's United Soccer Association players